Stactolaema is a bird genus in the African barbet family (Lybiidae) which was formerly included in the Capitonidae and sometimes in the Ramphastidae. It contains the following species:

External links
 

 
Bird genera
Barbets
Taxonomy articles created by Polbot